Falz or FALZ may refer to:

 FALZ, the DS100 code for Alzey station, Rhineland-Palatinate, Germany
 Falz, stage name for Nigerian rapper Folarin Falana (born 1990)

See also 
 Falz-Fein (disambiguation)
 Pfalz (disambiguation)
 Pfaltz (disambiguation)